Two ships of the Royal Navy have borne the name HMS Lenox:

  was a 70-gun third rate launched in 1678.  She was rebuilt in 1701, and again in 1723, before being sunk as a breakwater in 1756.
  was a 74-gun third rate launched in 1758.  She was sunk as a breakwater in 1784, before being raised and broken up in 1789.

See also
 Royal Navy ships named 

Royal Navy ship names